Octagon Cottage is an octagon house in rural Barren County, Kentucky, near Rocky Hill, Kentucky.

It was listed on the U.S. National Register of Historic Places in 1983.  It once had four octagonal outbuildings;  only one, an office, survived when the property was listed.

Recent coverage, including a photo.

References

Houses completed in 1850
National Register of Historic Places in Barren County, Kentucky
Octagon houses in the United States
Houses in Barren County, Kentucky
Houses on the National Register of Historic Places in Kentucky
1850 establishments in Kentucky